Solomon Lechesa Tsenoli is a South African politician who currently serves as the Deputy Speaker of the National Assembly of South Africa.

See also

African Commission on Human and Peoples' Rights
Constitution of South Africa
History of the African National Congress
Politics in South Africa
Provincial governments of South Africa

References

Living people
21st-century South African politicians
African National Congress politicians
Members of the National Assembly of South Africa
Year of birth missing (living people)

People from the Free State (province)